Joseph Arnot Lorimer Buick (born 1 July 1933) is a Scottish former footballer who made 31 appearances in the Football League playing for Lincoln City. He played as a wing half. He also played for his local team, Broughty Athletic, and in English non-league football for Weymouth, Cheltenham Town, and Ruston Bucyrus.

References

1933 births
Living people
Footballers from Dundee
Scottish footballers
Association football wing halves
Lincoln City F.C. players
Weymouth F.C. players
Cheltenham Town F.C. players
English Football League players
Southern Football League players
Broughty Athletic F.C. players
People from Broughty Ferry